Fluorotriiodomethane is a chemical compound and methane derivative with the chemical formula CFI3.

References

Halomethanes
Organofluorides
Organoiodides